Angram is a village near Bilbrough in the Harrogate district of North Yorkshire, England.

Angram was historically a township in the ancient parish of Long Marston in the West Riding of Yorkshire.  It became a civil parish in 1866.  In 1974 the parish was transferred to the new county of North Yorkshire.  In 1988 the parish was absorbed into the civil parish of Long Marston.

References 

Villages in North Yorkshire
Former civil parishes in North Yorkshire